Chahak (also Romanized as Chāhak; also known as Chāhūk and Chāqak) is a village in Eskelabad Rural District, Nukabad District, Khash County, Sistan and Baluchestan Province, Iran. At the 2006 census, its population was 91, in 17 families.

References 

Populated places in Khash County